Xuman [ˈhju:mən] is an epic pop band from Moscow, Russia founded May 11, 2009 by Sasha Xuman and Ilya Sosnitskiy. Through the band's lifetime their style switched from electropop to indie rock music.

History 
Xumans first public appearance was made in December 2009. During 2010 Xuman has been forming its live band and started playing gigs across Russia. When the Golden Age album came out in March 2011, Xuman started its Golden Age tour that ended in October of that same year. In May 2013 they released '49 Nymphomaniacs' EP.

Members 

 Sasha Xuman - music, lyrics, vocals, keys
 Ilya Sosnitskiy - music, lyrics, back-vocals, guitars, keys
 David Sagamonyants - drums

Discography

Albums 
 2011 — Golden Age
 2013 — 49 Nymphomaniacs (EP)
 2015 — The Mask Gains Over Man

Singles 
 2010 — Panic
 2012 — Play

Music videos
 2010 — 
 2011 — 
 2012 — 
 2013 —

References

Publications 
 2009.12.31 — XUMAN beings need less PANIC and more crazy bass action // TheBurningEar.com
 2010.08.11 — Introducing: Xuman // SilenceIsBoring.net
 2011.03.14 — Премьера: Альбом Xuman «Golden Age» // LookAtMe.ru

External links 
 Xuman music on Soundcloud
 Official Xuman Facebook page
 Official Xuman page on Twitter

Russian electronic music groups